Hoare logic (also known as Floyd–Hoare logic or Hoare rules) is a formal system with a set of logical rules for reasoning rigorously about the correctness of computer programs. It was proposed in 1969 by the British computer scientist and logician Tony Hoare, and subsequently refined by Hoare and other researchers. The original ideas were seeded by the work of Robert W. Floyd, who had published a similar system for flowcharts.

Hoare triple
The central feature of Hoare logic is the Hoare triple. A triple describes how the execution of a piece of code changes the state of the computation. A Hoare triple is of the form

 

Assertions are formulae in predicate logic.

Hoare logic provides axioms and inference rules for all the constructs of a simple imperative programming language. In addition to the rules for the simple language in Hoare's original paper, rules for other language constructs have been developed since then by Hoare and many other researchers. There are rules for concurrency, procedures, jumps, and pointers.

Partial and total correctness 

Using standard Hoare logic, only partial correctness can be proven. Total correctness additionally requires termination, which can be proven separately or with an extended version of the While rule. In the latter case, there is no "after", so  can be any statement at all. Indeed, one can choose  to be false to express that  does not terminate.

"Termination" here and in the rest of this article is meant in the broader sense that computation will eventually be finished, that is it implies the absence of infinite loops; it does not imply the absence of implementation limit violations (e.g. division by zero) stopping the program prematurely. In his 1969 paper, Hoare used a narrower notion of termination which also entailed the absence of implementation limit violations, and expressed his preference for the broader notion of termination as it keeps assertions implementation-independent:

Rules

Empty statement axiom schema

The empty statement rule asserts that the  statement does not change the state of the program, thus whatever holds true before  also holds true afterwards.

Assignment axiom schema

The assignment axiom states that, after the assignment, any predicate that was previously true for the right-hand side of the assignment now holds for the variable. Formally, let  be an assertion in which the variable  is free. Then:

 

where  denotes the assertion  in which each free occurrence of  has been replaced by the expression .

Thus were  true prior to the assignment, by the assignment axiom, then  would be true subsequent to which. Conversely, were  false (i.e.  true) prior to the assignment statement,  must then be false afterwards.

Examples of valid triples include:

All preconditions that are not modified by the expression can be carried over to the postcondition. In the first example, assigning  does not change the fact that , so both statements may appear in the postcondition. Formally, this result is obtained by applying the axiom schema with  being ( and ), which yields  being ( and ), which can in turn be simplified to the given precondition .

The assignment axiom scheme is equivalent to saying that to find the precondition, first take the post-condition and replace all occurrences of the left-hand side of the assignment with the right-hand side of the assignment. Be careful not to try to do this backwards by following this incorrect way of thinking: ;
this rule leads to nonsensical examples like:
 

 

While a given postcondition  uniquely determines the precondition , the converse is not true. For example:
,
,
, and

are valid instances of the assignment axiom scheme.

The assignment axiom proposed by Hoare does not apply when more than one name may refer to the same stored value. For example,
 
is wrong if  and  refer to the same variable (aliasing), although it is a proper instance of the assignment axiom scheme (with both  and  being ).

Rule of composition

For example, consider the following two instances of the assignment axiom:

and

By the sequencing rule, one concludes:

Another example is shown in the right box.

Conditional rule

The condition, must not have side effects.
An example is given in the next section.

This rule was not contained in Hoare's original publication.
However, since a statement 

has the same effect as a one-time loop construct

the conditional rule can be derived from the other Hoare rules.
In a similar way, rules for other derived program constructs, like  loop,  loop,  can be reduced by program transformation to the rules from Hoare's original paper.

Consequence rule

This rule allows to strengthen the precondition  and/or to weaken the postcondition .

For example, a proof of

needs to apply the conditional rule, which in turn requires to prove
,   or simplified 

for the  part, and
,   or simplified 

for the  part.

,   which is logically equivalent to
.
The consequence rule is needed to strengthen the precondition  obtained from the assignment rule to  required for the conditional rule.

Similarly, for the  part, the assignment rule yields
,   or equivalently
,
Informally, the effect of the consequence rule is to "forget" that  is known at the entry of the  part, since the assignment rule used for the  part doesn't need that information.

While rule

Here  is the loop invariant, which is to be preserved by the loop body .
After the loop is finished, this invariant  still holds, and moreover  must have caused the loop to end.
As in the conditional rule,  must not have side effects.

For example, a proof of 

by the while rule requires to prove
,   or simplified
,
which is easily obtained by the assignment rule.

After applying the while rule with  being , it remains to prove
,
which follows from the skip rule and the consequence rule.

In fact, the strange program is partially correct: if it happened to terminate, it is certain that  must have contained (by chance) the value of 's square root.
In all other cases, it will not terminate; therefore it is not totally correct.

While rule for total correctness

If the above ordinary while rule is replaced by the following one, the Hoare calculus can also be used to prove total correctness, i.e. termination as well as partial correctness. Commonly, square brackets are used here instead of curly braces to indicate the different notion of program correctness.

In this rule, in addition to maintaining the loop invariant, one also proves termination by way of an expression , called the loop variant, whose value strictly decreases with respect to a well-founded relation  on some domain set  during each iteration. Since  is well-founded, a strictly decreasing chain of members of  can have only finite length, so  cannot keep decreasing forever. (For example, the usual order  is well-founded on positive integers , but neither on the integers  nor on positive real numbers ; all these sets are meant in the mathematical, not in the computing sense, they are all infinite in particular.)

(This is one of various notations for total correctness.)

Resuming the first example of the previous section, for a total-correctness proof of

the while rule for total correctness can be applied with e.g.  being the non-negative integers with the usual order, and the expression  being  , which then in turn requires to prove

Informally speaking, we have to prove that the distance  decreases in every loop cycle, while it always remains non-negative; this process can go on only for a finite number of cycles.

The previous proof goal can be simplified to
,
which can be proven as follows:
 is obtained by the assignment rule, and 

For the second example of the previous section, of course no expression  can be found that is decreased by the empty loop body, hence termination cannot be proved.

See also

Notes

References

Further reading 

 Robert D. Tennent. Specifying Software (a textbook that includes an introduction to Hoare logic, written in 2002)

External links
 KeY-Hoare is a semi-automatic verification system built on top of the KeY theorem prover. It features a Hoare calculus for a simple while language.
 j-Algo-modul Hoare calculus — A visualisation of the Hoare calculus in the algorithm visualisation program j-Algo

1969 in computing
Program logic
Static program analysis